The Vulcan statue is the largest cast iron statue in the world, and is the city symbol of  Birmingham, Alabama, reflecting its roots in the iron and steel industry. It was created as Birmingham's entry for the Louisiana Purchase Exposition (1904 World's Fair) in St. Louis, Missouri. While it is the world's largest made of iron, it is also among the nation's tallest statues of any kind.

History

Construction
He next sculpted a clay master model in an unfinished church in Passaic, New Jersey, and this was then divided into sections and transported by railroad to the Birmingham Steel and Iron Company for the preparation of casting molds for the iron.

The sculptor, Giuseppe Moretti, received an artist's fee of $6,000, which would be about $ in  dollars. The Commercial Club of Birmingham held art shows, concerts, baseball games, and many more activities to raise the estimated $15,000 ($ in  dollars) it would cost to build and transport the statue. It is also noted that pot metal statuettes of Vulcan were sold at both the St. Louis World's Fair and in Birmingham, Alabama for two dollars apiece to help in the accumulated costs it took to create the statue.

The Vulcan statue consists of 29 cast-iron components with connecting flanges that are bolted together internally. The heaviest section is his whole head, which weighs . Iron forgemen designed and executed the connection details for the statue, which originally had no internal framework and was self-supporting. The grey iron castings were made in Birmingham entirely from locally produced iron.

1904 World's Fair
The statue was shipped to St. Louis as Birmingham's entry into the 1904 World's Fair.  Vulcan dramatically demonstrated the mineral riches and manufacturing capabilities of the Birmingham area while on display in the Louisiana Purchase Exposition's "Palace of Mines and Metallurgy".  It was awarded a "Grand Prize".

When the 1904 World's Fair ended, the Vulcan statue was dismantled and returned to its home city of Birmingham, only to be left in pieces alongside the railroad tracks due to unpaid freight bills.

Alabama State Fairgrounds
The Vulcan statue was eventually re-erected at the Alabama State Fairgrounds, but the statue's arms were installed incorrectly, and the god was without his spear, which had been lost on the way from St. Louis.

With nothing to hold in its hands, Vulcan soon became an advertising figure.  Over the years, Vulcan held an ice cream cone, a Coca-Cola bottle, and even Heinz pickles.  In the late 1920s, the statue was disassembled for inspection. During this time, children would often play around the disassembled statue.  It was painted a flesh color and was reassembled in the early 1930s.

Atop Red Mountain
It was not until 1936 that the statue found a suitable home, thanks to the Works Progress Administration, which partially funded a new park in the city at the top of Red Mountain.  A  pedestal was built of local sandstone, and Vulcan was hoisted into place.  A new spear was fabricated to be held high in his right hand while his left hand held a hammer at his side.  Vulcan was repainted in an aluminum like finish. The statue's naked buttocks have been a source of humor for many years. A novelty song, "Moon Over Homewood," refers to the fact that the statue "moons" the neighboring suburb of Homewood, Alabama.

A nine-day festival commenced on May 7, 1939 to dedicate Vulcan Park.  Evelyn Tully was crowned  the Vulcan Queen.   Guests of honor included the foundrymen who originally cast Vulcan.  A crowd of 5,000 was present for the opening night of the festival.

In 1938 a challenge was sent out to hundreds of engineers and architects throughout the Southeast to design the base and park area.  There were hundreds of submissions but a little known draftsman by the name of Carl Franklin Edins from Birmingham, Alabama was unanimously declared the winner.

To take full advantage of Vulcans position overlooking Birmingham, the city's Junior Chamber of Commerce in 1946 made the statue into a symbol for road safety.  His spear was replaced by a neon torch that glowed green, except during the 24 hours following a fatal traffic accident, when it glowed red. The spear was restored after the 1999–2004 restoration.

In 1949, Vulcan got new neighbors, when two television stations, WAFM-TV (now WVTM) and WBRC located their studios and towers on Red Mountain.

Centennial facelift

To celebrate Birmingham's centennial, the area around the statue was given a $1 million facelift in 1971.  The original tower was clad in Alabama marble with an elevator and observation deck added. A covered walkway also connected a gift shop and snack bar.  Vulcan was repainted a rust red  a few years later.  Vulcan was listed on the National Register of Historic Places on July 6, 1976.

Unfortunately, the statue itself had, when originally placed atop the pedestal, been filled up to the chest with concrete and had begun to deteriorate seriously due to different expansion and contraction rates of concrete versus cast iron. By 1990, an engineering study found that the statue was in danger of collapse.

1999–2004 restoration

Vulcan was removed during October and November 1999 in preparations for a $14 million renovation process that saw the park and pedestal restored to its original 1938 appearance. The statue sat in Vulcan Park's parking lot until the fall of 2001, when it was shipped to Robinson Iron to be repaired. The statue itself was thoroughly inspected and repaired, with some parts, including the lost spear point, re-cast. The new and restored pieces were thoroughly coated with a durable paint system, including a light-gray finish coat dubbed "Vulcan Gray" by the specifier.

Meanwhile, in 2002, the 1971 park additions were demolished, and scaffolding went up around Vulcans tower. Workmen cleaned and repaired the original tower. Vulcans head and right arm went on display at the Birmingham Museum of Art while the tower was prepared.

Vulcan was re-erected on a steel armature atop his tower during June 2003, restored to its original appearance as intended by Moretti, reoriented to the east. Television stations WVTM and WBRC both provided live webcams of the reinstallation.

Shortly after the statue was reinstalled, the scaffolding came down, and a new observation deck, providing panoramic views of the area, was installed. The museum at the base was rebuilt and a new elevator was installed, but oriented so it would not be easily seen from downtown Birmingham. The original waterfalls were not rebuilt, though the stone walkways leading from the parking lot directly to Vulcans tower were restored. The statue and park were officially reopened in 2004, celebrating Vulcan's 100th birthday.  In 2004, Vulcan Park welcomed more than 100,000 visitors who took in the statue's views of downtown Birmingham.

The restoration project received a National Preservation Honor Award from the National Trust for Historic Preservation in 2006.

Vulcan Park and Museum

Vulcan Park and Museum (VPM) features views of Birmingham, an interactive history museum that examines Vulcan and Birmingham's story, and a 10-acre (4 ha) urban green space. In May 2007, Vulcan Park and Museum was designated an official Birmingham Information Center by the Greater Birmingham Convention and Visitors Bureau and offers information on transportation services, restaurants, events and other cultural offerings in Birmingham.

Vulcan Park and Museum is operated by Vulcan Park Foundation, a non-profit organization with a mission to preserve and promote Vulcan as the symbol for the Birmingham region, to advance knowledge and understanding of Birmingham's history and culture, and to encourage exploration of the region.

See also
Birmingham District
List of statues
List of tallest statues
List of the tallest statues in the United States
WVTM Channel 13 – local television station with call letter V for Vulcan
An ode to Vulcan by Alabama poet Charles Ghigna was published by AL.com.

References
Notes

Bibliography

External links

Vulcan Park and Museum
The Vulcan statue on display in St. Louis at the 1904 World's Fair from St. Louis Public Library Digital Collections
Vulcan photos and newspaper articles at the Birmingham Public Library
Historic American Engineering Record (HAER) documentation:

"Colossi of the Ancient World" – A Birmingham Historical Society Information booklet (2 pages in pdf)
Vive Vulcan! – A Birmingham Historical Society activity book (40 pages in pdf)

National Register of Historic Places in Birmingham, Alabama
Outdoor sculptures in Alabama
Buildings and structures in Birmingham, Alabama
1904 sculptures
Colossal statues in the United States
Tourist attractions in Birmingham, Alabama
Parks in Birmingham, Alabama
Iron sculptures in the United States
Historic American Engineering Record in Alabama
Works Progress Administration in Alabama
Sculptures of Roman gods
1904 establishments in Alabama
Cast-iron sculptures
Vulcan (mythology)